Anthony Lippini (born 7 November 1988) is a French former professional footballer who played as a full-back for Clermont Foot, Montpellier HSC Troyes AC, Tours, Gazélec Ajaccio.

References

External links

1988 births
Living people
Sportspeople from Bastia
French footballers
Footballers from Corsica
Association football defenders
Corsica international footballers
Ligue 1 players
Ligue 2 players
Challenger Pro League players
Montpellier HSC players
ES Troyes AC players
AC Ajaccio players
Clermont Foot players
Tours FC players
A.F.C. Tubize players
Gazélec Ajaccio players